Aké Arnaud Loba (born 1 April 1998) is an Ivorian professional footballer who plays as a forward for Liga MX club Mazatlán F.C..

Club career
Born in Divo, Loba joined SOA's youth setup in 2015, from Association Sportive des Enseignants d’Abobo. He made his debut for the former during the 2016–17 campaign, being also named in the Team of the Year.

On 30 December 2017, Loba signed for Peruvian Primera División side Universidad San Martín. He made his professional debut the following 4 February, starting in a 4–0 home routing of Ayacucho FC.

Loba scored his first professional goal on 11 February 2018, netting his team's second in a 2–1 away win against Comerciantes Unidos. He finished the season with 18 goals, being also named the Player of the Season, but losing it to Gabriel Costa.

On 23 December 2018, Loba joined Liga MX side Querétaro on a one-year loan deal.

On 14 January 2020, Loba joined Mexican club Monterrey on a permanent deal.

On 7 July 2021, Loba transferred to Nashville SC of Major League Soccer as a designated player. The deal was for a reported $6.8 million, a club-record transfer fee.

Honours
Monterrey
Copa MX: 2019–20
CONCACAF Champions League: 2021

References

External links

1998 births
Living people
People from Divo, Ivory Coast
Ivorian footballers
Association football forwards
Peruvian Primera División players
Club Deportivo Universidad de San Martín de Porres players
Querétaro F.C. footballers
C.F. Monterrey players
Nashville SC players
Mazatlán F.C. footballers
Ivory Coast under-20 international footballers
Ivorian expatriate footballers

Expatriate footballers in Peru
Ivorian expatriate sportspeople in Mexico
Expatriate footballers in Mexico
Designated Players (MLS)
Major League Soccer players